Lille Laboratory of Electrical Engineering and Power Electronics (L2EP - ) is a French research laboratory (CNRS EA 2697) focused on electrical engineering. It is located in Lille and is a part of Institut Carnot ARTS and COMUE Lille Nord de France.

L2EP research teams support academic activities in the following institutes of the COMUE Lille Nord de France :
 Arts et Métiers ParisTech
 École centrale de Lille
 HEI
 University of Lille

It supports doctoral researches and hosts PhD doctoral candidates in relationship with the European Doctoral College Lille Nord de France.

Research area
Research area focuses on :
 Power electronics, converters, energy storage
 modeling and control
 power electronics optimisation
 modeling electrical grids
 electromagnetic simulations

L2EP Labs are the core of the Centre national de recherche technologique de Lille FUTURELEC « Réseaux et machines électriques du futur ».

External links
 L2EP labs site
 Institut CARNOT ARTS

University of Lille Nord de France
Laboratories of Arts et Métiers ParisTech
Laboratories in France
French National Centre for Scientific Research